458th may refer to:

458th Air Expeditionary Group, a provisional United States Air Force unit assigned to the United States Air Forces in Europe
458th Airlift Squadron (458 AS), part of the 375th Airlift Wing at Scott Air Force Base, Illinois
458th Tactical Fighter Squadron, an inactive United States Air Force unit
No. 458 Squadron RAAF, Royal Australian Air Force

See also

458 (disambiguation)
.458